The 2022–23 EuroLeague Regular Season is the premier European competition for men's basketball clubs. A total of 18 teams compete in the regular season to decide the eight places of the playoffs.

Format
In the regular season, teams play against each other home-and-away in a round-robin format. The eight first qualified teams will advance to the playoffs, while the last ten qualified teams will be eliminated. The matchdays are from 6 October 2022 to 14 April 2023.

Tiebreakers
When all teams have played each other twice:
 Best record in head-to-head games between all tied teams.
 Higher cumulative score difference in head-to-head games between all tied teams.
 Higher cumulative score difference for the entire regular season.
 Higher total of points scored for the entire regular season.
 Higher sum of quotients of points in favor and points against of each match played in the regular season.
If a tiebreaker does not resolve a tie completely, a new tiebreak process is initiated with only those teams that remain tied. All points scored in extra periods will not be counted in the standings, nor for any tie-break situation.

League table

Positions by round
The table lists the positions of teams after completion of each round. In order to preserve chronological evolvements, any postponed matches are not included in the round at which they were originally scheduled, but added to the full round they were played immediately afterwards.

Results by round
The table lists the results of teams in each round.

Matches

Round 1

Round 2

Round 3

Round 4

Round 5

Round 6

Round 7

Round 8

Round 9

Round 10

Round 11

Round 12

Round 13

Round 14

Round 15

Round 16

Round 17

Round 18

Round 19

Round 20

Round 21

Round 22

Round 23

Round 24

Round 25

Round 26

Round 27

Round 28

Round 29

Round 30

Round 31

Round 32

Round 33

Round 34

Average home attendances

References

External links
Official website

2022–23 EuroLeague